Syekh Hamzah Fansyuri Airport is an airport located in Singkil, Aceh Singkil Regency, Aceh, Indonesia.

Airlines and destinations
The following destinations are served from this airport:

Statistic

References

Airports in Aceh